A Season on the Brink is a 2002 made-for-television sport drama film directed by Robert Mandel. Based on a book by John Feinstein entitled A Season on the Brink which detailed the turbulent 1985–86 season of Indiana University's men's basketball team, led by coach Bobby Knight, the film became the first ESPN television film, premiering on March 10, 2002.

The production was filmed in Winnipeg, Manitoba, Canada. The premiere of the movie was simulcast on ESPN with the unexpurgated version and ESPN2 with all profanities censored. Future airings were of the uncensored version. The movie was also released on DVD in late 2002.

Cast
Brian Dennehy - Bob Knight
Al Thompson - Delray Brooks
Benz Antoine - Joby Wright
James Lafferty - Steve Alford
Michael James Johnson - Daryl Thomas
Dan Becker - Dan Dakich
Patrick Williams - Stew Robinson
Yorick Parke - Andre Harris
Gary Hudson - Ron Felling
Mike Weekes - Todd Jadlow
Duane Murray - Kohn Smith
Thomas Hauff - Ed Williams
Phoenix Gonzales - Charlene
Manfred Maretzki - Joseph Wisnofsky
Chad Bruce - Elisberg
James D. Kirk - Pat Knight
Digger Phelps - Himself
Jessica Scott - Beth

References

External links

Indiana Hoosiers men's basketball
Films set in 1984
Films set in 1985
Films set in 1986
1985–86 NCAA Division I men's basketball season
American biographical drama films
2002 biographical drama films
2002 television films
2002 films
Films directed by Robert Mandel
ESPN Films films
American basketball films
Films scored by Randy Edelman
Films scored by Steve Porcaro
American drama television films
2000s American films